The 2022–23 USC Trojans women's basketball team represents the University of Southern California during the 2022–23 NCAA Division I women's basketball season. The Trojans play their home games at the Galen Center and are members of the Pac-12 Conference. The squad is led by second-year head coach Lindsay Gottlieb, who was hired on May 10, 2021.

The Women of Troy finished the regular Pac-12 season tied for 4th with UCLA and Arizona. Because both of those teams held tiebreakers over USC, the Trojans earned the 6th seed in the 2023 Pac-12 Conference women's basketball tournament.

Previous season
The 2021-22 USC Trojans women's basketball team finished with an overall record of 12-16 and a 5-12 conference record. They earned the 10th seed in the 2022 Pac-12 Conference women's basketball tournament.

Offseason changes

Assistant Coach Danyelle Grant moved to serve as an assistant coach at Rice. In her place, Gottlieb hired Beth Burns from Louisville as Associate Head Coach.

As for players, the Women of Troy brought in 1 first-year and 7 transfers. 3 students graduated, and 6 students transferred to other schools.

Departures

Incoming transfers

2022 recruiting class

Gayles will sit out this whole season as she recovers from her injuries that resulted from gun violence in April 2022. Since then, Gayles has relearned how to walk and has been receiving support via coaching, physical therapy, counseling, and various other services.

Roster

Awards and honors
Gottlieb
ESPN Coach of the Week
Adika
Pac-12 All-Defensive Team Honorable Mention
Littleton
Pac-12 Women’s Basketball Player of the Week
NCAA March Madness Weekly Starting Five
College Sports Communicators All-District Academic Honors
All-Pac-12
Marshall
Preseason All-Pac-12 Honorable Mention
Pac-12 Women’s Basketball Player of the Week Award
NCAA March Madness Weekly Starting Five
Naismith Defensive Player of the Year Watch List
Naismith Defensive Player of the Year Semifinalist
All-Pac-12
Pac-12 All-Defensive Team
Miura
College Sports Communicators All-District Academic Honors
Sissoko
All-Pac-12
Williams
Pac-12 All-Defensive Team Honorable Mention
Team
ESPN Win of the Week
USBWA National Team of the Week

Schedule

|-
!colspan=12 style=| Exhibition

|-
!colspan=9 style=| Regular season

|-
!colspan=12 style=| Pac-12 tournament

|-
!colspan=12 style=| NCAA tournament

 
Source: USCTrojans.com

Rankings

Awards and honors

Notes

References

External links
 USC Athletics Site
 USC Basketball Fan Forums

USC Trojans women's basketball seasons
USC
USC Trojans basketball, women
USC Trojans basketball, women
USC Trojans basketball, women
USC Trojans basketball, women
USC